The 2011 Prosperita Open was a professional tennis tournament played on clay courts. It was the eighth edition of the tournament which was part of the 2011 ATP Challenger Tour. It took place in Ostrava, Czech Republic between April 25 – May 1, 2011.

ATP entrants

Seeds

 Rankings are as of April 18, 2011.

Other entrants
The following players received wildcards into the singles main draw:
  Lukáš Dlouhý
  Martin Přikryl
  Nicolas Reissig
  Jiří Veselý

The following players received entry from the qualifying draw:
  Kamil Čapkovič
  Pavol Červenák
  Andis Juška
  Ádám Kellner

Champions

Singles

 Stéphane Robert def.  Ádám Kellner, 6–1, 6–3

Doubles

 Olivier Charroin /  Stéphane Robert def.  Andis Juška /  Alexander Kudryavtsev, 6–4, 6–3

External links
Official Website
ITF Search
ATP official site

Prosperita Open
Prosperita Open
Prosperita Open
Prosperita Open
Prosperita Open